Are'eta Subregion is a subregion in the Southern Red Sea region (Zoba Debubawi Keyih Bahri) of Eritrea. With its capital at Tiyo, the administrative district's coastline includes the Bay of Anfilla.

References

Subregions of Eritrea

Southern Red Sea Region
Subregions of Eritrea